Blaisdon railway station is a disused stone built railway station that served the village of Blaisdon in Gloucestershire and was the first stop on the Gloucester to Hereford line after Grange Court junction.

The station has been demolished.

References

Further reading

External links
Blaisdon Halt on a navigable 1946 O. S. map

Former Great Western Railway stations
Disused railway stations in Gloucestershire
Railway stations in Great Britain opened in 1929
Railway stations in Great Britain closed in 1964
Beeching closures in England
Blaisdon